Zabel may refer to:

Zabel (engine), a German two-stroke motocross engine
Lord Raptor (Zabel Zarock), a character from the Darkstalkers video game series
Maja Zabel, a mountain peak in northern Albania and south-eastern Montenegro
Zabel Point, Antarctica

People
 Zabel of Armenia (1217–1252), queen regnant of Armenian Cilicia
 Zabel (given name)
 Zabel (surname)

See also 
 
 Zabell, a surname